María Josefa Paloma Filgueira y Rubio (born 1943), better known as Paloma Valdés, is a retired Spanish film and television actress.

Selected filmography
 The Balcony of the Moon (1962)
 The Innocents (1963)
 Camerino Without a Folding Screen (1967)

References

Bibliography 
 Peter Cowie & Derek Elley. World Filmography: 1967. Fairleigh Dickinson University Press, 1977.

External links 
 

1943 births
Living people
Spanish television actresses
Spanish film actresses
People from Valladolid